Harry Norman Ernest Spencer (1 October 1901 – 13 August 1954) was an English first-class cricketer who played four matches between 1923 and 1932, one for Worcestershire and three for Warwickshire.

Born in Shipston-on-Stour, Warwickshire, Spencer made his first (and only) appearance for Worcestershire against the touring New Zealanders in June 1927. He picked up two wickets, dismissing the New Zealand captain Tom Lowry in each innings, but proved expensive: his ten overs cost him 68 runs. With the bat, Spencer made 26 and 2.

It was nearly three years before Spencer played first-class cricket again, and when it happened it was for Warwickshire. He played three matches for the county, but only managed one wicket in total, when he bowled his former teammate and Worcestershire opener Leslie Wright in the first innings of his first match for Warwickshire. In two subsequent games for the county, he bowled 31 overs without taking a wicket, although he was generally tidy: in his short Warwickshire career he conceded only 146 runs from 66 overs.

In 1954 Spencer was struck by a bus while crossing Oxford Street, London. As a result of this he died in Hammersmith at the age of 52.

References 
 Scores & Biographies, Volume 1 by Arthur Haygarth (SBnnn)
 Wisden Cricketers' Almanack (annual): various issues

External links 
 

1901 births
1954 deaths
English cricketers
Road incident deaths in London
Warwickshire cricketers
Worcestershire cricketers
People from Shipston-on-Stour